Ivan Yordanov (born 26 May 1939) is a Bulgarian weightlifter. He competed in the men's lightweight event at the 1960 Summer Olympics.

References

External links
 

1939 births
Living people
Bulgarian male weightlifters
Olympic weightlifters of Bulgaria
Weightlifters at the 1960 Summer Olympics
People from Veliko Tarnovo
Sportspeople from Veliko Tarnovo Province